The Douglas DT bomber was the Douglas Aircraft Company's first military contract, forging a link between the company and the United States Navy. Navy Contract No. 53305 of April 1, 1921, required only 18 pages to set out the specifications that resulted in the purchase of three DT (D for Douglas, T for torpedo) folding-wing aircraft.

The DT used a welded steel fuselage with aluminum covering the forward and center sections and fabric covering the rear section. Douglas built 46 DT-1 and DT-2 torpedo bombers for the U.S. Navy, Norwegian Navy, and Peruvian Navy. 20 DT-2 aircraft were built under license by the L-W-F Engineering Company Inc., six by the Naval Aircraft Factory (NAF), and 11 by the Dayton-Wright Company. Another seven were built for Norway under license by Marinens Flyvebåtfabrik. Although still in service when the Germans invaded Norway, the Norwegian DTs did not see action in the Norwegian Campaign. The DT could be fitted either with pontoons or wheeled landing gear and could carry a  torpedo.

The first flight was in November 1921 and production continued until 1929. The DT operated off the U.S. Navy's first aircraft carrier, from land bases, and from seaplane tenders. Several were flown by the Marine Corps.

Variations of the DT-2 aircraft were designated DT-4, DT-5, DT-6, and DTB. Machines licence-built by Dayton-Wright were internally designated SDW by that company. The type became the basis for the Douglas World Cruiser.

Variants
DT-1 Preproduction prototypes; three built.

DT-2 Two-seat torpedo-bomber biplane, powered by a  Liberty V-12 piston engine; 64 built.
DT-3 Proposed version of the DT-2. Not built.
DT-4 Four DT-2s converted into bomber aircraft by the Naval Aircraft Factory. The aircraft were fitted with direct-drive Wright T-2 V-12 engines.
DT-5 Redesignation of two DT-4s fitted with a geared  Wright T-2B V-12 engine.
DT-6 One DT-2 aircraft fitted with a  Wright P-1 radial piston engine.
DT-2B This designation was given to one DT-2 aircraft supplied to the Norwegian government. Seven similar aircraft were built under licence in Norway.
DTB Export version for Peru. Four aircraft built for the Peruvian navy, fitted with  Wright Typhoon V-12 piston engines.
SDW-1 Redesignation of three DT-2s modified by the Dayton-Wright company.

Operators

 
Royal Norwegian Navy Air Service
 
Peruvian Navy
 
United States Marine Corps
United States Navy

Specifications (DT-2 floatplane)

See also

References

External links

Douglas DT
Biplanes
DT
Single-engined tractor aircraft
Aircraft first flown in 1921